Brightwaters is a suburb of the City of Lake Macquarie in New South Wales, Australia on a peninsula east of the town of Morisset on the western shore of Lake Macquarie.

History 
Early industries were tinned fish and sugar cane. A sugar cane mill was built, but it was destroyed by a bushfire in 1875. A post office was opened in 1963 and closed in 1979.

Population
In the 2016 Census, there were 903 people in Brightwaters. 84.1% of people were born in Australia and 93.0% of people spoke only English at home.  The most common responses for religion in Brightwaters were No Religion 24.9%, Catholic 24.1% and Anglican 19.8%.

References

External links
 History of Brightwaters (Lake Macquarie City Library)

Suburbs of Lake Macquarie